The 1961 Sam Houston State Bearkats football team represented Sam Houston State Teachers College (now known as Sam Houston State University) as a member of the Lone Star Conference (LSC)  during the 1961 NAIA football season. Led by tenth-year head coach Paul Pierce, the Bearkats compiled an overall record of 8–1 with a mark of 7–0 in conference play, and finished as LSC champion.

Schedule

References

Sam Houston State
Sam Houston Bearkats football seasons
Lone Star Conference football champion seasons
Sam Houston State Bearkats football